Timothy Burns (May 31, 1820September 21, 1853) was an Irish American immigrant, Democratic politician, and Wisconsin pioneer.  He was the third Lieutenant Governor of Wisconsin, serving from 1852 until his death in 1853.

Early life
Born in Dublin, Ireland, on May 31, 1820, Burns came to New York in America with his family as an infant. In the fall of 1837 as a young man, he settled in Iowa County in Wisconsin Territory, where he engaged in lead mining.

Career
In 1844 Burns was elected sheriff of Iowa County. Elected in 1846, he served in the Wisconsin territorial House of Representatives in 1847-1848 and became Assembly Speaker. He visited La Crosse in 1847. Later, in 1849 he served in the Wisconsin State Assembly. In 1850, he moved to La Crosse, Wisconsin, and took a position on the State Board of Public Works. He was the chairman of the first La Crosse Town Board, chairman of the first La Crosse County Board and the first La Crosse county judge, while also engaging in the railroad industry.

In 1851, he was elected as a Democrat and became the Wisconsin's third Lieutenant Governor under the State's second Governor, Leonard Farwell.

Death and legacy
While visiting his brother-in-law in Lafayette County, Burns became ill of bilious fever but recovered enough to travel home, and died of a relapse in La Crosse on September 21, 1853. He is interred at Oak Grove Cemetery, La Crosse, Wisconsin.

Burns Park, in downtown La Crosse, and the town and community of Burns were named after him.

Electoral history

| colspan="6" style="text-align:center;background-color: #e9e9e9;"| General Election, November 4, 1851

References

External links
 Timothy Burns, La Crosse Republican and Leader, Mose Strong, September 20, 1871.
 Timothy Burns:Short-lived Settler left huge last memory, Myer Katz, La Crosse Tribune, November 8, 1981.
 Burns lite fire under young La Crosse, Reid Magney, La Crosse Tribune, March 4, 1998.
 Newspaper clippings courtesy of the La Crosse public library-archives.
Lieutenant Governor Timothy Burns of Wisconsin, Wisconsin State Historical Society

1820 births
1853 deaths
Irish emigrants to the United States (before 1923)
Lieutenant Governors of Wisconsin
Members of the Wisconsin Territorial Legislature
Wisconsin city council members
Wisconsin sheriffs
Wisconsin state court judges
County supervisors in Wisconsin
Politicians from La Crosse, Wisconsin
People from Iowa County, Wisconsin
19th-century American politicians
Burials in Wisconsin
19th-century American judges
Democratic Party members of the Wisconsin State Assembly